A sesquioxide is an oxide of an element (or radical), where the ratio between the number of atoms of that element and the number of atoms of oxygen is 2:3. For example, aluminium oxide  and phosphorus(III) oxide  are sesquioxides.
Many sesquioxides contain a metal in the +3 oxidation state and the oxide ion , e.g., aluminium oxide , lanthanum(III) oxide  and iron(III) oxide . Sesquioxides of iron and aluminium are found in soil. The alkali metal sesquioxides are exceptions because they contain both peroxide  and superoxide  ions, e.g., rubidium sesquioxide  is formulated . Sesquioxides of metalloids and nonmetals are exceptions too, e.g. boron trioxide , dinitrogen trioxide  and phosphorus(III) oxide .

Many transition metal oxides crystallize in the corundum structure type, with space group Rc. Sesquioxides of rare earth elements crystalize into one or more of three crystal structures: hexagonal (type A, space group Pm1), monoclinic (type B, space group C2/m), or body-centered cubic (type C, space group Ia).

Sesquioxidizing, meaning the creation of a sesquioxide, is the highest scoring word that would fit on a Scrabble board, though it does not actually appear in any official Scrabble dictionary. Though the Oxford English Dictionary already listed the noun and the past participle adjective — sesquioxidation and sesquioxidized, respectively — the verb, sesquioxidize, and its conjugated forms, have been absent from the dictionaries used as sources for the official Scrabble word lists. An early appearance of the noted present participle had occurred in the 1860 publication of the State of New York's Legislative Assembly's Transactions of the State Medical Society, yet the word's first appearance in a dictionary was in the 1976 edition of Josepha Heifetz Byrne's Mrs. Byrne's Dictionary of Unusual, Obscure, and Preposterous Words, One could theoretically score 2044 points in a single move, when otherwise only words from the official Scrabble word list are used.

List of sesquioxides

References